Charles King Van Riper  (September 8, 1891 – April 16, 1964), also known as C. K. Van Riper and Charlie to his friends, was an American newspaperman, writer, and playwright, and one of the founders of the nation's first amateur softball League in Carmel-by-the-Sea, California. He went on to build a successful scale-model ship on Martha's Vineyard in Massachusetts.

Early life 

Van Riper's father was Anthony B. Van Riper (1862-1917) of Paterson, New Jersey. He founded the silk manufacturer firm of Frost & Van Riper with his partner Harry B. Frost, for twenty-five years before his death.

Van Riper was a graduate of Rutgers College, class of 1913. Van Riper did newspaper work for New York and New Jersey newspapers until World War I, when he entered the United States Army Air Service. On June 4, 1917, Van Riper married Helen Dorothy Ordway (1893-1971) in New York City, New York. They had one child during their marriage, Anthony King Van Riper.

Professional background

After the World War I Van Riper came to Carmel-by-the-Se a to work freelance for newspapers, magazines, television and writing plays.

Van Riper Property

In 1920, Van Riper built one of the earliest houses on Carmel Point. It is located at 26262 Isabella Avenue between San Antonio and Inspiration Avenues. They were neighbors of Robinson Jeffers and his wife Una. The house is built with native stone and was a gathering place for their friends and neighbors.

The Van Riper house was purchased for $2.9 million. It was renamed "Grey Havens" for The Lord of the Rings. At the entrance to the property there is a  metal gate flanked by two gargoyles sitting atop stone pillars.  

In 1925, the only homes on Carmel Point were the homes of Col. Fletcher Dutton (1919), poet Robinson Jeffers and his wife Una (1919), Playwright Charles Van Ripers (1920, musician and attorney Edward G. Kuster (1920), George W. Reamer's house (1908), and Florence Wells's Driftwood Cottage (1908).

Abalone League

The Abalone League had its beginning on Carmel Point after World War I in 1921. Adjoining the Van Riper's stone house was a baseball field that was used by the Abalone League, which Van Riper helped organize. He and his wife played on the teams.

 

Games were held in a rough diamond field next to the Charles Van Riper house. Charles and Helen Van Riper and his friends, aviator Thorne Taylor and writer Talbert Josselyn (brother of photographer Lewis Josselyn) founded the first softball league in the Western United States, dubbed the Abalone League. The league got its name from the Abalone Cove, which was adjacent to the playing field. They played every evening in the summer months and on Sundays all year round. Six teams made up the league. Josselyn, Lee Gottfried, and Thorn Taylor were some of the first players. Charles Van Riper was the first "commissioner" and was responsible to begin each season. Journalist Robert Welles Ritchie served as the league's first umpire. They played two games on Sunday and had three playing fields, at Carmel Point, Carmel Woods, and the Hatton Fields.

Theater
[[File:Mr.Bunt (5).jpg|thumb|Van Riper in play Mr. Bunt ']]

On May 26, 1919, Van Riper published The Distant Shore, a drama in 4 acts, a 97-page typewritten manuscript.

Van Riper was active in theatrical as well as civic activities. In 1924, Van Riper was played the part of Jim, the circus man, in Mr. Bunt,'' an original play by Ira Mallory Remsen, which won the $100.00 prize annually offered by the Forest Theater.

Civic life
Van Riper was among the first to influence the thinking of the Carmel village. and was involved in village matters and was referred to as "solid as a rock."

In 1938, Van Riper was head of the committee to obtain signatures for a petition for the Sunset School District to secede from the Monterey Union High School District. The Sunset School District voted 724 in favor of, and 252 against, the passing of a $165,000 bond issue for a new Carmel high school.

Later life

In 1933, after a polo injury in California, Van Riper and traveled to Massachusetts to spend time with relatives and to visit his brother, Donald Van Riper. Charles and his wife Helen fell in love with Martha's Vineyard.

That same year, Van Riper ended up opening a ship-model shop and showroom in Vineyard Haven, Massachusetts, where he used the traditional Dutch spelling “Van Ryper” for the shop's name, Van Ryper of Vineyard Haven. He worked in a two-story wooden building on Beach Road. A small group of craftsmen were hired to build the model boats. The shop listed more than 250 different model ships in stock. In 1938, the shop received requests for ship-models from Moore-McCormack and the United States Maritime Commission, to help teach sailors and naval aviators how to recognize enemy warships by their silhouettes. 

In 1960, Van Riper stopped production at the shop after having a stroke. He kept the showroom open for another two years. In 1982, the South Street Seaport Museum acquired a collection of 285 Van Ryper ship models and archival materials from Van Riper's son, Anthony K. Van Riper. 

In October 1944, Van Riper divorced Ordway and married Celeste "Cece" Corcoran on October 5, 1945, in the Unitarian Church of All Souls in New York.

Death

Van Riper died on April 16, 1964, in Tisbury, Massachusetts, at the age of 72. His wife died on May 2, 1965, in a Boston, Massachusetts hospital, at the age of 71.

Legacy

At the Van-Riper House in Carmel-by-the-Sea, there is a historic plaque about the Abalone League. The text of the plaque provides a history of the league. It says:

See also
 Timeline of Carmel-by-the-Sea, California

References

External links

Martha's Vineyard Quarterly

  

1891 births
1964 deaths
People from California
People from New Jersey
People from Carmel-by-the-Sea, California